Todd Abramson is a former record label owner, booking agent and nightclub owner.

Background
Abramson was employed by Maxwell's in 1986. By 1993, Abramson was a partner in the running of the club. In 2017, Abramson was running his weekly radio show on Saturdays 3-6 p.m at WFMU-FM. His radio persona is characterized by his deadpan humor and catchphrases such as "Pow pow pow!"

In March 2019, he was the moderator in a panel discussion about Hoboken musicians in the 1980s.

Record label
Abramson formed Telstar Records, a Hoboken based label  which had been in operation since 1985. 

In 1988, girl group the Pussywillows who Todd Abrahamson had help get gigs had their Spring Fever album released on the label. They also recorded the song "Vindaloo" for the film, Kill the Moonlight.

In 1996, the Fleshtones had their Hitsburg USA! album released on the label.

One record that was issued on the label was by Little Diesel and the Weasels. It was recorded in the summer of 1974 in a small space and on to a TEAC recorder. Mixed by the band members, the album was recorded one at a time onto eight track cartridges and distributed to their friends. In 2006, having been re-mixed, and released on vinyl and compact disc by Telstar.

References

External links
 Discogs: Telstar Records

Living people
American entertainment industry businesspeople
Year of birth missing (living people)